Jonathan Tan Zen Yang (born 13 December 1995) is a Singaporean footballer who plays as a left winger for Singapore Premier League club Balestier Khalsa. He is currently serving his National Service and is playing football for Singapore Armed Forced Sports Association.

Career

Geylang International
Tan signed for Geylang International in the 2014 season. He made his debut in the second half of a 2–1 away loss to Warriors on 23 February.

Young Lions
He opts to join the Young Lions in 2016 as he fights for the SEA Games squad in 2017.

Balestier Khalsa
It was announced that he joined the Tigers for the 2017 season.

International career
He represented the Singapore national under-14 team at the 2009 Asian Youth Games, and was part of the national under-15 team which won the bronze medal at the 2010 Summer Youth Olympics.

International Statistics

U19 International caps

U19 International goals

Honours 
Singapore U15
 Summer Youth Olympics: bronze medalist, 2010

References

External links 
 

1995 births
Living people
Singaporean footballers
Association football wingers
Geylang International FC players
Singapore Premier League players
Singaporean sportspeople of Chinese descent
Footballers at the 2010 Summer Youth Olympics